Lafia Township Stadium is a multi-use stadium in Lafia, Nasarawa State, central Nigeria. It is currently used mostly for football matches and is the home stadium of Nasarawa United. The stadium has a capacity of 10,000 people. It is located in the heart of Lafia City, Lafia Township Stadium can be found along Jos-Makurdi Road, overlooking a shopping plaza.

References

Football venues in Nigeria
Lafia